Aleksei Alekseevich Korotnev (February 15, 1854, Moscow – June 14, 1915, Odessa) was a Russian zoologist

Korotnev graduated from Moscow University in 1876 and gained his doctorate there in 1881. In 1887 he became a professor at the St. Vladimir Imperial University of Kiev. In 1885 and in 1890-91, he made extensive zoological collections in the Indian Ocean and Pacific ocean regions. In 1886, he began studies at Observatoire Oceanologique de Villefranche  (Villafranca, France). Korotnev also studied the fauna of Lake Baikal between 1900 and 1902. His principal work was on the embryonic development of cnidarians, bryozoans, tunicates and insects.
He was a corresponding member of the St. Petersburg Academy of Sciences (1903).

Taxa named in honour
The following taxa have been named in honour (eponyms) of Aleksei Alekseevich Korotnev:

Gastropoda:
Korotnewia Kozhov, 1936
Korotnewia korotnevi (Lindholm, 1909)
Cincinna korotnevi (Lindholm, 1909)
Pseudancylastrum korotnevi Starobogatov, 1989 
Choanomphalus korotnevi Lindholm, 1909

Bivalvia:
Amesoda korotniewii (W. Dybowski, 1902)
Euglesa korotnevi (Lindholm, 1909)

Crustacea:
Baicalasellus korotnevi (Semenkevich, 1924)

References

Mazurmovich, B. N. O zhizni i deiatel’nosti professora Kievskogo universiteta A. A. Korotneva. Tr. Jn-ta istorii estestvoznaniia i tekhnikiANSSSR, 1958, vol. 24. pp. 196–211.The Great Soviet Encyclopedia, 3rd Edition (1970–1979).

External links
 Fokin S. (accessed 16. March 2012). "RUSSIAN PERIOD OF THE HISTORY OF THE VILLEFRANCHE-SUR-MER OCEANOLOGICAL STATION (1886—1930). EVENTS AND FACES".

1915 deaths
Russian zoologists
Biologists from the Russian Empire
Imperial Moscow University alumni
1854 births